Kampi is a small village located in the Nicosia District of Cyprus, east of the town of Palaichori Oreinis.

References

Communities in Nicosia District